Frederickton is a town on the Macleay River, New South Wales. Located about 6 km NE by N of Kempsey and about 7 km W by S of Smithtown. It is roughly 436 kilometres north of Sydney.
The Macleay Valley Bridge, the longest bridge on the Pacific Highway commences just to the East of town.

History

Frederickton was named after Frederick William Chapman. In a manuscript he wrote about his life on the Macleay River called Early Days on the Macleay 1836-1908 "I decided to subdivide a small portion of my property into township lots and call it Frederickton…they sold very well and a nice little village had soon formed."

He had surveyed the 170 acres for sub division. The locality had been the site of a ship building, this town was based around ship building, timber getting and pastoral pursuits.

References

External links
 
 Frederickton

Mid North Coast
Towns in New South Wales